Mir Abul Khayer is a Bangladesh Awami League politician and the former Member of Parliament of Dhaka-4.

Career
Khayer was elected to parliament from Dhaka-4 as a Bangladesh Awami League candidate in 1973.

References

Awami League politicians
Living people
1st Jatiya Sangsad members
Year of birth missing (living people)